The Sanyo PHC-25 is a home computer released 1983 by the electronics company Sanyo. It is a member of the same family as the Sanyo PHC-10 and Sanyo PHC-20. The machine was presented on the U.S. at the 1983 CES. PHC is an acronym for Personal Home Computer. It came with Sanyo Basic v1.3, an eighty instruction BASIC dialect.

A few emulators exist for this system.

Technical specifications
The computer had the following technical specifications:
 CPU: NEC D780C (compatible Zilog Z80A), 4 MHz
 Memory: 16K RAM, 6KB VRAM, 24K ROM
 Keyboard: 65 keys, 4 function keys, 4 arrow keys
 Text Modes: 16 x 16 / 32 x 16
 Graphic Modes: Motorola 6847, 64 x 48 (8 colors) / 128 x 192 (4 colors) / 256 x 192 (4 colors)
 Sound: Optional (PSG-01 extension)
 I/O Ports: Tape, Centronics, RGB, video

References

Sanyo products
Home computers
Z80-based home computers
Computer-related introductions in 1983